In re Hayes Microcomputer Products, Inc. Patent Litig., 982 F.2d 1527 (Fed. Cir. 1992) was a case decided in 1992 by the United States Court of Appeals for the Federal Circuit, the successor of the United States Court of Customs and Patent Appeals. It concerned, among other things, whether or not the software on a patented device needed to be disclosed in a patent application.

Case details

Background
In 1985, Dale Heatherington was issued a patent entitled "Modem with Improved Escape Sequence Mechanism to Prevent Escape in Response to Random Occurrence of Escape Character in Transmitted Data," and the patent was assigned to Hayes Microcomputer Products. When other companies began marketing modems that made use of infringing technologies, Hayes asked for licensing fees. The infringing companies then filed suit, claiming that Hayes's patent was invalid because it did not meet the disclosure requirements of 35 U.S.C §112 because the patent did not contain a description of the firmware on the modem.

Issues
The main issue before the court was whether or not a patent like Hayes's needs to disclose the code for the firmware or software that runs on the invention in order to meet §112's disclosure requirements.

Decision
The court decided in favor of Hayes. In its decision, it referred to an earlier case, In re Sherwood, in which the court stated that source code disclosure was often not necessary to fulfill §112's disclosure requirement, since the creation of source code is usually within the skill of the art.

Importance
In re Hayes was important primarily because it built upon the precedent set by Sherwood that source code disclosure is often not required.

References

External links
 
 35 U.S.C §112 on BitLaw.

Software patent case law
United States patent case law
1992 in United States case law
United States Court of Appeals for the Federal Circuit cases